Family voting is when family members enter a voting booth together and collude or direct voting intentions.

The organisation Democracy Volunteers has noted family voting for example in elections in the UK, the Netherlands and in Sweden.

References 

Democracy
Electoral fraud